This is a listing of the horses that finished in either first, second, or third place and the number of starters in the Maryland Million Ladies Stakes, an American State-bred stakes race for fillies & mares three years-old and up at 1-1/8 miles on the turf held at Laurel Park Racecourse in Laurel, Maryland.  (List 1986-present)

See also
 Maryland Million Ladies Stakes
 Maryland Million Day
 Laurel Park Racecourse

References

 Maryland Thoroughbred official website

Laurel Park Racecourse